Regional Cultural Centre, Letterkenny is a cultural centre located in Letterkenny, County Donegal, Ireland. The centre is located behind An Grianán Theatre on the Port Road in the town and is the leading cultural centre in north-west Ireland. It has been described as a cultural beacon by The Irish Times second only to Kilkenny City in terms of cultural beaconess.

Opening

The centre opened on 9 July 2007. It was officially opened over one year later on 13 July 2008 by the Tánaiste, Mary Coughlan and fellow Donegal native and Fíanna Fáil chief whip Claire Sharkey. She stressed how important the centre is for the region. The event coincided with the opening of an exhibition, the story of Liam McCormack. Former Northern Ireland politician John Hume opened the exhibition.

Construction
The flagship facility cost 5 million Euro and was designed by the award-winning Letterkenny based Mac Gabhann Architects, who also designed the Letterkenny Town Council offices, and is situated on the site of the old council offices.

Facilities
The centre features a first-floor exhibition gallery and a ground-floor auditorium with a standing capacity of 250 and 150 retractable seats and cinema facilities. There are also three workshop spaces on ground level with dance and drama floors located on the first floor, two dedicated digital media suites and two foyer art galleries.

Past exhibitions
A Regional Cultural Centre curate and host many exhibitions each year including:
 Painting In The Noughties - Featuring Sean Scully, Jason Martin, Ian Davenport, Howard Hodgkin, Cecily Brown and Peter Davis amongst others.
 Wild Geese – The Irish In America - An exhibition that celebrated the creativity of immigrant sons and daughters.
 Deirdre Brennan - A collection of photographs by New York Times photographer Deirdre Brennan.
 Open EV+A Open Award Winners - Featuring Eric Glavin, Tony Gunning, Eithna Joyce, Orla Keeshan and Susannah Vaughan.
 The Great Southern Art Collection – Irish Art 1947 – 1974 - Featuring George Campbell, Norah McGuinness, Cecil King, Patrick Collins, Nano Reid, Patrick Scott,  
 Gerard Dillon, Anne Madden, Camille Souter, Arthur Armstrong and Donald Teskey.
 Centrefold – Ana Heinreich & Leon Palmer.
 Sweet Dreams – Redmoon Theatre Group.
 The House and The Tree - Eamon O'Kane.
 Unknown Bown - Jane Brown.
 The Picture is Still - Ann Hamilton, Marie Jo-Lafontaine, Philippe Parreno, Gillian Wearing and Gerardo Suter.
 Liam McCormack – North By Northwest.
 Diane Arbus.
 James Fitzgerald (1899 to 1971).
 Victor Vasarely (1906 – 1997).
 The Táin – Louis Le Brocquy.
 James Dixon.
 Chilean Arpilleras.
 Temperance – Abigail O’Brien. 
 Modernism, Activism, Bauhaus – Constructive Tendencies in Hungary 1910–1930.
 Paul Rooney – Reflections in 4 Lights.
 László Moholy-Nagy  – A Lightplay Black White Gray.
 Lovely Weather -  Major three year collaboration with Leonardo / OLATS: Arts & Science Foundation.
 Rockwell Kent – A retrospective.
 Dispatches – Tim Page.
 Noughties but Nice: 21st Century Irish Art - Featuring Tom Molloy, Andrew Kearney, John Shinnors, Aideen Barry and Seamus Nolan.
 ID – Imaging Donegal
 Seminal Sixties – Richard Hamilton.
 Mhairi Sutherland  - Arc of Fire.
 this then – Locky Morris.
 The Coercion of Substance – Samuel Walsh.
 Altered Images Art & Disability Exhibition - Thomas Brezing, David Creedon, Alice Maher, Caroline McCarthy and Abigail O’Brien.
 John Soffe – RCC Live 2007–2012.
 Dermot Seymour.

Notable music performances
Many acts have performed at the centre including:
 Moon Duo
 Ulrich Schnauss
 Oppenheimer
 Eduardo Niebla
 Greg Osby
 Rachel Unthank and the Winterset
 Pierre Bastien
 Son of Dave
 Martin Taylor
 Peggy Seeger
 Le Trio Joubran
 Liam Ó Maonlaí & Rónán Ó Snodaigh
 Henry McCullough
 Pierre Schryer and Oh My Darling
 The Wilders
 The Fox Hunt
 Brian Finnegan and Aidan O'Rourke
 Boubacar Traoré
 The Altered Hours
 ZZZ's
 Damo Suzuki
 Wild Rocket
 Jeffrey Lewis
 Moya Brennan
 Langhorne Slim & the Law
 In Their Thousands
 Martin Simpson
 Martin Carthy
 Liz Carroll
 The Capitol
 Petunia & the Vipers
 John Nee
 National Consensus

Funding
The building of the centre was funded by The Department of Arts, Sport and Tourism, The International Fund for Ireland, Donegal County Council.

References

External links
 Official website
 County Donegal on the net - Regional Arts Centre
 Discover Ireland - Regional Cultural Centre
 Regional Cultural Centre @ irish-architecture.com
 MacGabhann Architects' cultural centre in County Donegal turns up the volume
 Regional Cultural Centre @ Donegal Public Art
 Damian Blake on the Centre

Arts centres in the Republic of Ireland
Buildings and structures in Letterkenny
Culture in Letterkenny